The area around Constantinople was affected by a major earthquake in AD 447. It caused serious damage to the recently completed Theodosian Walls in Constantinople, destroying 57 towers and large stretches of the walls. The historical records contain no mention of casualties directly associated with this earthquake, although many thousands of people were reported to have died in the aftermath due to starvation and a "noxious smell".

Earthquake
There is some uncertainty in the date of this earthquake, with 26 January, 6 November, 8 November and 8 December all being proposed.

References

Further reading
 

Earthquakes in the Byzantine Empire
Theodosius II
Constantinople
447
5th century in the Byzantine Empire
5th-century earthquakes
Tsunamis
Earthquakes in Turkey